The Southern Province is one of the four provinces of Sierra Leone. It covers an area of 19,694 km² and has a population of 1,438,572 (2015 census). It consists of four districts (Bo, Bonthe, Moyamba, and Pujehun). Its capital and administrative center is Bo, which is also the second largest and second most populated city in Sierra Leone after the nation's capital Freetown. The population of the southern province is largely from the Mende ethnic group.

Geography

Districts
The province is divided into 4 districts.
Bo District, capital Bo
Bonthe District, capital Mattru Jong
Moyamba District, capital Moyamba
Pujehun District, capital Pujehun

Borders
Southern Province has the following borders:
Western Area: far northwest
North West Province: northwest
Northern Province: northeast
Eastern Province: east
Grand Cape Mount County, Liberia: southeast
To the south and west of Southern Province is the Atlantic Ocean.

Ecology
Sierra Leone's last remaining stand of rainforest is at Gola.

Religion

See also
Subdivisions of Sierra Leone

References

External links

 
Provinces of Sierra Leone